James Lawrence English (June 5, 1813 – May 29, 1889) was an American lawyer and Democratic politician.

Born in Philadelphia, Pennsylvania, English lived in Pettis County, Missouri, prior to moving to Sacramento, California, in 1853. Shortly after his arrival, he became associated with Philip Leget Edwards in the Sacramento law firm of Edwards and English.

English was Mayor of Sacramento in 1855, and his administration was one of unusual prosperity for the city. From 1857 to 1858, he was California State Treasurer. He also served as a delegate to the Democratic National Convention in 1876.

James L. English died at age 76 in Sacramento. He is interred in the Sacramento Historic City Cemetery.

References

Los Angeles Times, May 30, 1889, "Death of James L. English," p. 5.

External links
James L. English at the Political Graveyard
Sacramento Masonic Lodge No. 40 - James L. English

1813 births
1889 deaths
California Democrats
California lawyers
Mayors of Sacramento, California
State treasurers of California
Politicians from Philadelphia
People from Pettis County, Missouri
19th-century American politicians
19th-century American lawyers